Dernst "D'Mile" Emile II (born January 24, 1985) is an American record producer and songwriter from Brooklyn, New York City. He was sometimes referred to as D. Emile, Dernst Emile II, or Dee'Mile and is most commonly known and accredited as D'Mile. According to his official Twitter profile, he is signed by Medinah Entertainment and managed by Natalie Prospere.

His production work with artists H.E.R. and Lucky Daye was nominated for seven Grammy Awards in 2020. D'Mile became the first songwriter in Grammy history to win Song of the Year two years running. He won in 2021 as co-writer on H.E.R.'s song "I Can't Breathe" and in 2022 for Silk Sonic's "Leave the Door Open". D'Mile also won an Academy Award for Best Original Song for co-writing the song "Fight for You" from the film Judas and the Black Messiah.

Early life
Emile is the son of Haitian vocalist Yanick Étienne, who was featured in recordings by and toured with Bryan Ferry and Roxy Music in the 1980s, and music producer Dernst Emile. He grew up in Flatbush, Brooklyn, New York City, and began learning to play the keyboard as a young child.

Career

2005–2012: Career beginnings
Emile made his major production debut on Rihanna's 2005 album Music of the Sun, for which he produced & co-wrote "That La, La, La" with fellow Brooklyn hip-hop group Full Force. Later the same year, he also made an appearance on Mary J. Blige's 2005 album The Breakthrough with the song "Gonna Breakthrough," which he co-wrote and produced. After these bodies of work, a friend introduced D'Mile to Rodney Jerkins, with whom he had an apprenticeship for two years.

He scored his first main chart success with Janet Jackson's tenth studio album, Discipline. He produced and co-wrote the lead single "Feedback," which reached number one on the U.S. Hot Dance Club Play chart, the R&B hit "Luv" as well as the album tracks "I.D.", "Truth or Dare" and "The Meaning".

Justin Bieber worked with D'Mile on "Favorite Girl," which is the fourth single from his debut album My World. D'Mile is also listed as producing the R&B ballad "In the Morning" for Mary J. Blige's ninth album Stronger with Each Tear.

He then worked with Diddy and Dirty Money on their album, "Last Train To Paris," which was released December 14, 2010, producing the song, "Shades", which was co-produced with Justin Timberlake's production group The Y's and featured guest vocals from Timberlake, Lil Wayne, Bilal, and James Fauntleroy II. He also has several productions on Jennifer Lopez's 2011 comeback album, Love? including "One Love"; and the dance-pop number "(What Is) Love?" which was released as the lead soundtrack single and scored in Lopez's 2010 romantic comedy, The Back-up Plan.

D'Mile produced several songs and served as the executive producer for Diggy Simmons' album, Unexpected Arrival, which was released March 20, 2012, on Atlantic Records. D'Mile has produced the single, "Long Distance" by 2011 X-Factor winner, Melanie Amaro which she performed live on the show, December 6, 2012.

2013–present: Current projects
D'Mile has had a strong production record with Ty Dolla Sign, including his Beach House series, Beach House, Beach House 2, Beach House EP, and Beach House 3. Ty Dolla Sign has said that D'Mile is "literally the best producer [he has] ever worked with" following their collaborations. He also produced "Livin' It Up" from Ciara's 2013 album Ciara.

In 2016, he produced the two tracks "Mind Of A Man" and "FWM" for Hard II Love by Usher.

Throughout 2016 and 2017, D'Mile produced all 13 songs on Lucky Daye's debut album titled Painted after the two met in LA. D'Mile also provided background vocals on the song "Paint It." The album was released in 2019 and went on to be nominated at the 2020 Grammy Awards for Best R&B Album, with two album tracks being nominated for Best R&B Performance ("Roll Some Mo") and Best Traditional R&B Performance ("Real Games").

In 2020, he co-produced Charlie Wilson's "Forever Valentine" with Bruno Mars and The Stereotypes. He and Mars also composed Arashi's "Whenever You Call".

Selected discography
This is a non-comprehensive list of D'Mile's production credits, adapted from Tidal.

Awards and nominations

Academy Awards

!
|-
! scope="row"| 2021
| "Fight for You"
| Best Original Song
| 
| style="text-align:center;"|
|}

Grammy Awards

!
|-
! scope="row"| 2017
| "Still"
| Best Traditional R&B Performance
| 
|rowspan="10" style="text-align:center;"| 
|-
! scope="row" rowspan="2"| 2019
| "Could've Been"
| rowspan="2"| Best R&B Song
| 
|-
| "Roll Some Mo"
| 
|-
! scope="row"| 2020
| "I Can't Breathe"
| Song of the Year
| 
|-
!scope="row" rowspan="6"| 2022
| rowspan="3"| "Leave the Door Open"
| Record of the Year
| 
|-
| Best R&B Song
| 
|-
| rowspan="2"| Song of the Year
| 
|-
| rowspan="2"| "Fight for You"
| 
|-
|Best Song Written for Visual Media
| 
|-
| Table for Two
| Best Progressive R&B Album
| 
|-
!scope="row" rowspan="4"|2023
| Good Morning Gorgeous
| Album of the Year
| 
| rowspan="4"|
|-
| rowspan="2"|"Good Morning Gorgeous"
| Record of the Year
| 
|-
| Best R&B Song
| 
|-
| Himself
| Producer of the Year, Non-Classical
| 
|}

Golden Globe Awards

!
|-
! scope="row"|2021
| "Fight for You" 
| Best Original Song
| 
| style="text-align:center;"|
|-
|}

References

External links
 Official website

1985 births
Living people
Best Original Song Academy Award-winning songwriters
Grammy Award winners
Musicians from New York (state)
Record producers from New York (state)
Songwriters from New York (state)
American musicians of Haitian descent